The Fried parameter or Fried's coherence length (commonly designated as ) is a measure of the quality of optical transmission through the atmosphere due to random inhomogeneities in the atmosphere's refractive index. In practice, such inhomogeneities are primarily due to tiny variations in temperature (and thus density) on smaller spatial scales resulting from random turbulent mixing of larger temperature variations on larger spatial scales as first described by Kolmogorov. The Fried parameter has units of length and is typically expressed in centimeters. It is defined as the diameter of a circular area over which the rms wavefront aberration due to passage through the atmosphere is equal to 1 radian, and typical values relevant to astronomy are in the tens of centimeters depending on atmospheric conditions. For a telescope with an aperture, the smallest spot that can be observed is given by the telescope's Point spread function (PSF).

Although not explicitly written in his article, the Fried parameter at wavelength  can be expressed in terms of the so-called  atmospheric turbulence strength  (which is actually a function of temperature fluctuations as well as turbulence) along  the path of the starlight:

where  is the wavenumber. If not specified, a reference to the Fried parameter in astronomy is understood to refer to a path in the vertical direction. When observing at a zenith angle , the line of sight passes through an air column which is  times longer, producing a greater disturbance in the wavefront quality. This results in a smaller , so that in terms of the vertical path z, the operative Fried parameter  is reduced according to:

At locations selected for observatories, typical values for  range from 5 cm for average seeing to 20 cm under excellent seeing conditions. Since professional telescopes have diameters , they can only obtain an image resolution approaching their diffraction limits by employing adaptive optics.

When not stated explicitly, the wavelength is typically understood to be .

See also 
 Astronomical seeing
 Adaptive optics
 Greenwood frequency

References 

Astronomical imaging